Zygaena mana   is a species of moth in the Zygaenidae family. It is found in Adshara Gebiet, Georgia, "Transkaukasien" and Armenia. It is similar to Zygaena brizae but differs in that the hindwing is more broadly edged with black.

References

External links
Lepiforum de

Moths described in 1892
Zygaena